That's Not the Way to Die (French: On ne meurt pas comme ça) is a 1946 mystery crime film directed by Jean Boyer and starring Erich von Stroheim, Anne-Marie Blanc and Denise Vernac. The film's sets were designed by the art director Aimé Bazin. It borrows its main plot device from the 1932 American film The Death Kiss. von Stroheim was not happy with the film, but felt it received good reviews and was popular with audiences.

Synopsis
At a film studios while shooting a scene in which a man is killed, director Eric von Berg angrily calls cuts and rebukes the actor and shouts "That's Not the Way to Die". However, the actor soon turns out to be really dead, murdered by somebody present.

Cast
 Erich von Stroheim as 	Eric von Berg
 Anne-Marie Blanc as Marianne
 Denise Vernac as 	Lynn Laurens
 Jean Témerson as Le commissaire
 André Tabet as	Cazenave
 Jean-Jacques Delbo as 	Pierre Vanier
 Jean Berton as 	Le régisseur
 Sylvie as Suzanne Bouvier
 Sinoël as Marcel
 René Havard as L'assistant
 Georges Lannes as Le docteur Jacques Forestier
 Jacqueline Pierreux as La figurante
 Marcel Vallée as 	Le producteur

References

Bibliography 
 Lennig, Arthur. Stroheim. University Press of Kentucky, 2004.

External links 
 

1946 films
French mystery films
French drama films
French crime films
1946 mystery films
1946 drama films
1946 crime films
1940s French-language films
Films directed by Jean Boyer
Films about filmmaking
1940s French films